Adult Contemporary is a chart published by Billboard ranking the top-performing songs in the United States in the adult contemporary music (AC) market, based on weekly airplay data from radio stations compiled by Nielsen Broadcast Data Systems.

In the issue of Billboard dated January 4, "Sucker" by the Jonas Brothers returned to the top spot, displacing another of the group's songs, "Like It's Christmas", which was the final chart-topper of 2019.  "Sucker" had spent 11 weeks atop the chart in the fall of 2019 and added a further six weeks to its total in 2020 before being displaced by "Someone You Loved" by Lewis Capaldi. The Scottish singer's track spent five weeks in the top spot to add to the single week it spent at number one in the previous year. 

In late March, pop-rock band Maroon 5's song "Memories" reached number one, a position which it went on to hold for 20 weeks before it was replaced by "Circles" by rapper Post Malone in early August.  In the issue of Billboard dated August 22, British singer Harry Styles gained his first AC number one with "Adore You", and two weeks later Maren Morris topped the chart for the first time in her own right with "The Bones"; she had previously reached number one as a featured vocalist on "The Middle" in collaboration with Zedd and Grey. In the issue of Billboard dated November 7, Canadian singer The Weeknd achieved his first Adult Contemporary number one with "Blinding Lights", which remained atop the chart for five consecutive weeks.  The final AC number one of the year was, a new version of the 1940s Christmas song "White Christmas" by Meghan Trainor featuring Seth MacFarlane which reached the top spot; it was the first chart-topper for actor/singer MacFarlane.  The song continued a trend of Christmas-themed tracks topping the AC chart in December, reflecting the fact that adult contemporary radio stations usually switch to playing exclusively festive songs in the period leading up to the holiday.

Chart history

See also
 2020 in American music

References

2020
Number-one adult contemporary singles
United States Adult Contemporary